Athanasios Ragazos (15 August 1913 – 1993) was a Greek long-distance runner. He competed in the marathon at the 1948 Summer Olympics.

References

External links
 

1913 births
1993 deaths
Athletes (track and field) at the 1948 Summer Olympics
Greek male long-distance runners
Greek male marathon runners
Olympic athletes of Greece
Mediterranean Games medalists in athletics
Mediterranean Games silver medalists for Greece
Athletes (track and field) at the 1951 Mediterranean Games
People from Magnesia (regional unit)
Sportspeople from Thessaly